The 1992 All-Big Eight Conference football team consists of American football players chosen by various organizations for All-Big Eight Conference teams for the 1992 NCAA Division I-A football season.  The selectors for the 1992 season included the Associated Press (AP).

Offensive selections

Quarterbacks
 Chip Hilleary, Kansas (AP-1)

Running backs
 Calvin Jones, Nebraska (AP-1)
 Derek Brown, Nebraska (AP-1)

Tight ends
 Dwayne Chandler, Kansas (AP-1)

Wide receivers
 Victor Bailey, Missouri (AP-1)
 Michael Westbrook, Colorado (AP-1)

Centers
 Jim Scott, Nebraska (AP-1)

Offensive linemen
 Will Shields, Nebraska (AP-1)
 Jim Hansen, Colorado (AP-1)
 Keith Loneker, Kansas (AP-1)
 Mike Bedosky, Missouri (AP-1)

Defensive selections

Defensive ends
 Travis Hill, Nebraska (AP-1)
 Chad Brown, Colorado (AP-1)

Defensive lineman
 Dana Stubblefield, Kansas (AP-1)
 John Parrella, Nebraska (AP-1)
 Leonard Renfro, Colorado (AP-1)

Linebackers
 Keith Burns, Oklahoma State (AP-1)
 Greg Biekert, Colorado (AP-1)
 Ron Woolfork, Colorado (AP-1)

Defensive backs
 Deon Figures, Colorado (AP-1)
 Jaime Mendez, Kansas State (AP-1)
 Tyrone Byrd, Nebraska (AP-1)

Special teams

Place-kicker
 Dan Eichloff, Kansas (AP-1)

Punter
 Sean Snyder, Kansas State (AP-1)

Coach of the Year
 Pat Jones, Oklahoma State (AP-1)

Key

AP = Associated Press

See also
 1992 College Football All-America Team

References

All-Big Seven Conference football team
All-Big Eight Conference football teams